Peter Bell may refer to:

People
 Peter Hansborough Bell (1810–1898), Governor of Texas, U.S. representative
 Peter Bell (footballer, born 1976), Australian rules footballer, played for Fremantle and North Melbourne
 Peter R. Bell (born 1954), Australian rules footballer, played for St Kilda and Sandringham
 Peter Bell (actor), British actor
 Peter Bell (German politician) (1889–1939), German teacher and politician
 Peter Alan Bell (born 1958), American doctor of osteopathic medicine
 Peter Albany Bell, caterer and confectioner in Western Australia

Other
 Pietje Bell (novel series), a series of Dutch children's books from 1914–1936
 Peter Bell (film), a 2002 Dutch film
 Peter Bell II: The Hunt for the Czar Crown, 2003 Dutch film
 Peter Bell, a 19th-century English phrase for a "simple rustic" (after Wordsworth's poem of the same title)
 Peter Bell: A Tale, a long poem by William Wordsworth first published in 1819
 Peter Bell the Third, a poem by Percy Bysshe Shelley, written as a parody of Wordsworth's Peter Bell

Bell, Peter